The 2015 GPL Spring was the seventh edition of the Garena Premier League, a Riot Games-organised tournament for League of Legends, the multiplayer online battle arena video game. The 2015 GPL Spring  is a fully professional League of Legends league over all of the Southeast Asia region, with 16 teams from 5 countries/areas to determine which team is the best in the region.

Format
Group Stage #1
  16 teams divided into 4 groups of 4 (8 Seeded, 8 Unseeded)
  Double Round Robin, Each match is Best of Two.
 2:0 Winning team receives 3 points.
 1:1 Both teams receive 1 point.
  Top 2 teams from each group advance to Group Stage 2.
 All Ties Broken by Head-to-Head Record
  Leading team in 4 group at GPL Spring 2015 after week 4 will be qualified to participate Taipei IEM play-off
Group Stage #2
  8 teams divided into 2 groups of 4 (4 Seeded, 4 Unseeded)
  Double Round Robin, Each match is Best of Two.
 2:0 Winning team receives 3 points.
 1:1 Both teams receive 1 point.
  Top 2 teams from each group advance to Playoffs.
 All Ties Broken by Head-to-Head Record
Play-off
 Four teams participate
 Both 1st place teams from Group Stage #2 plays 2nd place from the other group in the semifinals
 Matches are best of five
 Winner qualifies for the 2015 International Wildcard Invitational
 Finalists qualify for the SEA Finals

Qualifications

Qualified teams

Rosters

Results

Group stage
Group Stage #1 
 Group A

 Group B

 Group C

 Group D

Group Stage #2
 Group A

Tiebreaker Match 
 Bangkok Titans 2−0 269 Gaming 

 Group B

Playoffs

Participants
 Saigon Fantastic Five

 269 Gaming

 Bangkok Titans

 Insidious Legends

Results

Final standings

References

External links
 Official website

Sports leagues in Asia
League of Legends competitions
League